Xtreme Pro Wrestling (XPW) is an American independent professional wrestling promotion owned by Rob Zicari and operated by Extreme Gifts. The promotion is known for its deathmatch style. From 2000 to 2002, XPW held an annual death match tournament called Baptized in Blood, also known as the King of the Deathmatch Tournament.

Zicari originally ran the promotion out of Los Angeles from 1999 to 2002. He appeared on shows as the on-camera owner under the ring name Rob Black alongside his then-wife Lizzy Borden. The promotion focused on hardcore wrestling and had connections to the Los Angeles porn industry, as Zicari was the real life owner of the Extreme Associates pornographic film production company.

In 2002, Shane Douglas, who previously wrestled for the promotion, returned to XPW as its booker and moved the "All-New XPW" to his home state of Pennsylvania. Credited to the promotional efforts of Douglas and Cody Michaels, XPW's East Coast move was initially successful in cities like Philadelphia and Pittsburgh before, ultimately, being deemed a failure and contributing to the promotion's closure in 2003. After the promotion became defunct, Big Vision Entertainment held two XPW reunion shows, Cold Day In Hell in May 2008 and XPW X in August 2009. Perros del Mal Producciones held a third XPW reunion show, Perros del Mal vs. XPW: Xtremo y Sangriento, in August 2011.

In 2021, after XPW was featured on Vice's Dark Side of the Ring series, Zicari relaunched the promotion, basing it out of Rochester, New York.

History

Early years (1999–2002)
Xtreme Pro Wrestling (XPW) was founded in summer 1999 on the West Coast, based primiarily in Los Angeles, California. The promotion based its style on hardcore wrestling, featuring many dangerous matches. In addition, XPW kept a major focus on the soap opera aspect of wrestling, as the storylines involved porn stars, alternative lifestyles, profanity, and sadistic violence. The first XPW event was held on July 31, 1999 at the Reseda Country Club. The initial announce team for XPW consisted of Kris Kloss and Larry Rivera, with Kloss doing the play-by-play and Rivera taking on the role as a heel color commentator. Kloss's trademark was screaming expletives or shrieking a high pitched scream when something shocking occurred in a match. Rivera often sided with owner Rob Black, calling him the "Donald Trump of the pro wrestling business", and his trademark announcing consisted of referring to Kloss as "chico", using "chico" in nearly all of his sentences, and occasional wandering into Spanish announcing. In this period, the promotion's main stars were homegrown wrestlers, but many former stars of Extreme Championship Wrestling (ECW) passed through XPW following the fall of that promotion.

In 2000, Rob Black purchased six front row tickets for ECW's Heat Wave pay-per-view. The tickets for the show were given to a cadre of XPW talent, as their mission was to make it clear that ECW was on enemy turf. At the beginning of the main event, the XPW contingent (The Messiah, Kid Kaos, Supreme, Kristi Myst, Homeless Jimmy, and Kris Kloss) donned shirts emblazoned with the logo of their home promotion, gaining the attention of security and Tommy Dreamer. Security ejected the XPW group and a brawl in the parking lot broke out between the XPW ring crew and the ECW wrestlers, though the XPW wrestlers were not involved. In the parking lot, several of the ECW wrestlers brutalized the XPW ring crew until several of the ring crew members were left bloodied. It was initially reported that Kristi Myst touched Francine and that prompted the incident, but Francine, herself, has since stated that she was never grabbed or touched by any of the XPW contingent, and other eyewitnesses supported the story that Francine was never touched. Although fans did throw up the XPW arm signature, XPW was not officially acknowledged on the telecast. On-screen, Joey Styles, ECW's color commentator, stated during the incident "apparently The Sandman has shared a few too many beers with the fans at ringside" and "apparently a drunken fan at ringside put his hands on Francine."

Shortly after the ECW incident, XPW had their first-anniversary event, Go Funk Yourself, at the Los Angeles Memorial Sports Arena on July 22, 2000. The main event saw XPW World Heavyweight Champion Sabu defeat Terry Funk. The event was considered by many as a high point for XPW; though it was four more months until XPW put on another event. During the hiatus, an attempt to bring in Atsushi Onita, a pioneer of Japanese deathmatch wrestling, for an exploding ring match failed.

One of the main storylines for most of 2001 concerned the heel stable known as the Black Army. The Black Army was headed by Rob Black, assisted by his wife Lizzy Borden and XPW's top star The Messiah, and feuded with Sabu. Also, throughout most of 2001, another heel stable called the Enterprise emerged and would eventually feud with the Black Army the following year. Originally consisting of former Black Army henchmen Steve Rizzono, motivational speaker TJ Rush, porn star Veronica Caine, and G. Q. Money, the stable became fully formed at the Damage Inc. event when Kid Kaos won the newly created XPW Television Championship and turned his back on his uncle Supreme, aligning himself with the Enterprise. After this surprise heel turn, Kid Kaos dropped the "Kid" from his name and nicknamed himself "The Rock Superstar" Kaos.

For a year, from April 2001 to April 2002, XPW ran events at Los Angeles' Grand Olympic Auditorium. Notable events during this period, included Genocide, which featured a double-ringed WarGames-style cage match and Free Fall, which included the infamous 40-foot scaffold match between Vic Grimes and New Jack. Many big names debuted in XPW during these events, such as The Sandman, Vampiro, Konnan, the Insane Clown Posse, and Psicosis.

At XPW's third-anniversary event, Night of Champions in July 2002, Shane Douglas made his return to XPW as the mystery opponent of Johnny Webb, winning the XPW World title. The event also saw the XPW's third King of the Deathmatch Tournament, matches from which got released on home video as Baptized In Blood III. Douglas would work as both an in-ring performer and booker for the promotion; under Douglas' influence, the promotion would move its operations from the West Coast to the Philadelphia, Pennsylvania, basing itself at the former ECW Arena.

East Coast invasion and closure (2002–2003)
XPW debuted at the former ECW Arena on August 31, 2002, at the Hostile Takeover event, and Shane Douglas became the promotion's focal point for the rest of the year. Controversy arose when XPW signed an exclusive lease with the ECW Arena, preventing other independent promotions from holding events at the venue. As XPW continued to run on the East Coast, the risqué storylines were quickly phased out, and a majority of XPW's West Coast employees were not a part of the East Coast-based "All-New XPW." The relocation to the East Coast also resulted in more former ECW stars passing through XPW, whether it be on a regular basis or one-night appearances.

XPW would eventually return to their former home of Los Angeles for a few events in early 2003. On March 8, 2003, the promotion held an event in Pittsburgh, Pennsylvania, which had 1,500 people in attendance, mainly due to Pittsburgh being Shane Douglas's hometown. This would be XPW's very last event; there was event scheduled for April 2003 but it was cancelled. Tickets for the April 2003 event were reported to be selling very poorly prior to the event, leading to the event being cancelled, though XPW announced they were canceling the event due to a large storm.

In April 2003, Rob Black and Lizzy Borden were indicted on obscenity charges due to pornographic material produced by XPW's parent company, Extreme Associates. Federal agents in Pittsburgh had purchased the offending material, which depicted scenes of rape, urination, and murder. The trial took a financial toll on Black and Borden, and the two could no longer financially subsidize XPW, with the promotion going out of business. Xtreme Entertainment Group (which would later split into two companies, XEG and Big Vision Entertainment), the company of which former XPW employee Kevin Kleinrock would later become Executive Vice President, purchased the XPW name and video library in 2004. Black later stated "If I never got indicted I would have definitely kept the wrestling thing going."

In the summer of 2003, the only pay-per-view (PPV) of the original XPW, The Best of XPW, aired. The PPV featured a compilation of highlights from XPW's past events.

Reunions

Cold Day in Hell (2008)

An XPW reunion show called Cold Day in Hell took place on May 24, 2008, at Aviation Park in Redondo Beach, California. The event was originally going to be called "Hell Freezes Over", but was changed to Cold Day in Hell.

In June 2007, Big Vision Entertainment, the owners of XPW, worked on MTV's Wrestling Society X which featured many XPW alumni. While working on the project, the company came up with the idea to hold an XPW reunion show. The event was produced by Kevin Kleinrock, Mike Hartsfield, and Kris Kloss. Vic Grimes was originally scheduled to be part of the event but had to drop out due to an injury.

Big Vision Entertainment released Cold Day in Hell on DVD and Blu-ray in January 2009, which included the entire event and its 45-minute pre-show.

Preliminary matches
The reunion show started with the first ever "Dynamite D Tribute Battle Royal". Carnage eventually lit the tape on his hand on fire and eliminated the final remaining competitors with a flaming clothesline. Carnage, after receiving the D Cup, gave it to Dynamite D's mother.

Prior to the second match, XPW held the Miss Extreme Competition, which was hosted by Joey Ryan. The participating women competed in competitions like lap dances and beer chugging. During a competition that involved being spanked with a barbed wire covered glove, Nicky "The New York Knockout" beat up the other contestants and no official winner was declared.

Kaos and Vampiro wrestled in the second match, which included Kaos being slammed onto a fluorescent light tube. Kaos ultimately won the match, with both wrestlers' backs cut and bleeding from the glass.

Prior to "The Hardcore Homo" Angel's match, he was presented with a birthday cake and presents for his 19th birthday. G. Q. Money was hiding among the gifts, attacking Angel with the help of Bo Cooper. At the conclusion of the match, Money shot a fireball at Angel to pick up the victory.

Following the Angel/Money match, J-Love forced Leroy the Ring Crew Guy to clean up the remaining glass from the Kaos/Vampiro match. Pogo The Clown came out with a shovel and beat up both Leroy and J. Love, before being stopped by a Singapore cane wielding Sandman, who then faced Pogo in a match. Sandman eventually picked up the victory after J-Love hit Pogo with a Singapore cane.

Terry Funk, the special referee for the Johnny Webb and Raven vs. Homeless Jimmy and Sabu match, announced that Sabu could not compete due to a broken vertebra in his neck and would be replaced by Concussion. Sabu, however, came to the ring during the match and, although he was removed by security, distracted Funk enough that Funk got knocked out by the wrestlers in the match. Raven and Webb ultimately picked up the victory after Webb gave Jimmy a DDT on top of a chair.

Next was the Team Rev Pro vs. Team XPW match which saw Ron Rivera, Disco Machine, and Joey Ryan of Rev Pro face Jardi Frantz, Vinnie Massaro, and X-Pac of XPW. Team XPW ultimately lost the match when Disco pinned Franz. Following the match, X-Pac hit the Bronco Buster on both Mr. McPhenom and CW Anderson.

This was followed by a three-way match which saw Luke Hawx defeat Jack Evans and Scorpio Sky.

Main event matches
In the first match of a double main event, The Gangstas (New Jack and Mustafa) were scheduled to face The Westside NGZ (Chronic and B.G. Rott). B.C. Killer and Mr. California came out instead of The Gangstas and began beating up The Westside NGZ. The Gangstas eventually came out and attacked both teams before ultimately winning the match. Following the match, New Jack announced his retirement.

The final match of the event saw Necro Butcher face Supreme for the XPW King of the Deathmatch Championship. Supreme won the match and the championship after delivering a back body drop onto a fluorescent light tube.

Results

Ten Year Anniversary Spectacular (2009)

A second XPW reunion show called Ten Year Anniversary Spectacular, nicknamed XPW X, took place on August 22, 2009, at the Arena Night Club in Los Angeles. The event took place on the same weekend as SummerSlam, which was also taking place in Los Angeles. The main event of the show was a XPW King of the Deathmatch Championship match in which Supreme beat "The Hardcore Homo" Angel.

Pre-show
During the first match on the event's pre-show, Joey Dynamite, Ray Rosas, and Oso Loco defeated Clay Motley, The Rookie 88, and Lucha Machine in a six-man tag team match. This was followed by a six-way match where Marcus Riot defeated Damien Arsenick, Willie Mack, LTP, Famous B, and Chimera.

Just prior to the start of the event's main card, Stepfather and The Red-Headed Stepchild called out and attacked Sexy Chino, who was then saved by Tool.

Preliminary matches
At the beginning of the event, Damien Steele was announced as the organization's new commissioner. Steele then announced a tournament to crown a new XPW World Heavyweight Champion. While Steele was announcing the tournament matches, he was interrupted by Homeless Jimmy who demanded to be involved in the tournament. Babi Slymm attacked Jimmy from behind and a tournament match was made between the two. Jimmy defeated Slymm to advance in the tournament. The rest of the tournament would not occur and the championship remained vacant until XPW's relaunch in 2021.

Next was an eight-person mixed tag match that saw Team SPW (Dante, Timothy Thatcher, El Chupacabra, Dante and Christina Von Eerie) defeat Team XPW (Matt Classic, Johhny Webb, Cast Iron Cothern, and The Fabulous Thunderkitty).

Mr. McPhenom then announced his intentions to purchase XPW. McPhenom stated that he would make XPW more family friendly and sports entertainment-based. G. Q. Money, McPhenom's financial adviser, was order to "bring the green" that would be used to complete the purchase. However, when McPhenom realized what G. Q. brought wasn't money but was marijuana, McPhenom attacked G.Q. and a match was made between the two for later in the evening.

Following the McPhenom/Money segment, Monica and Vinnie Massaro defeated Joey Ryan and J-Love in a 10-minute iron man strip match where the wrestler who was pinned the most times had to remove an article of clothing. As part of the stipulation, J-Love was supposed to take off her bra but refused and instead brought out a body double, who removed her bra to reveal both breasts covered with a black x. After this match, G. Q. Money defeated Mr. McPhenom.

Scorpio Sky and M-Dogg 20 wrestled to a time limit draw. After the match, Luke Hawx came to the ring and challenged M-Dogg 20, who was one-half of the final XPW World Tag Team Champions, and Sky to a tag title match. After M-Dogg 20 accepted, Hawx revealed his partner to be Sky, who turned on M-Dogg 20 and attacked him. Tool then entered the ring and was deemed Cross' new partner. The two teams wrestled with Hawx and Sky winning the match and the championship. After the match, Leroy the Ring Crew Guy was attacked by Pogo The Clown.

Main event matches
In the first match of a double main event, Carnage faced Youth Suicide in a Burned in Hell Death match. Weapons used during the match included a barbed wire covered bat, light bulbs, a glass shower door, and a staple gun. Vic Grimes, who accompanied Youth Suicide at ringside, lit a pizza cutter on fire and attacked Carnage with it but he would eventually recover and win the match after throwing lit flash paper at Youth Suicide.

In the final match of the event, Supreme successfully defended the XPW King of the Deathmatch Championship against "The Hardcore Homo" Angel in a Death match. Supreme dedicated the match to his father, who had died earlier that week.

Results

Perros del Mal vs. XPW (2011)

On August 20, 2011, XPW held their third reunion show, Perros del Mal vs. XPW: Xtremo y Sangriento, a co-promoted event with Perros del Mal in Tultitlan, Mexico. The event took place at Central de Refacciones, a local junk yard.

In the semi-main event match, Lolita defeated Sexy Star in a 2-out-of-3 falls stripping match. The loser of each fall had to remove an article of clothing; Lolita won 2 falls to 1, forcing Sexy Star to remove her bra, although she tried to cover herself up.

During the final match of the event, Damián 666, Bestia 666, Halloween, and X-Fly defeated Carnage, Johnny Webb, Kaos, and Supreme in an eight-man tag team extreme match. Damián earned the victory for his team after powerbombing Supreme onto light tubes. After the match, Damián announced his intentions to retirement but ask for one last match against Supreme, in an electrified cage where the XPW King of the Deathmatch Championship would be on the line.

Revival (2021–present)
During the summer of 2021, Zicari announced on Instagram and Twitter his plans to relaunch XPW.

The first event of the revived XPW, Rebirth, streamed on FITE TV pay-per-view from the Main Street Armory in Rochester, New York on November 7, 2021. Eight wrestlers competed during the event in a traditional single-elimination tournament for the then-vacated XPW World Heavyweight Championship, which was won by Brian Cage.

XPW's Killifornia event took place at the Derby Room in Pomona, California on April 9, 2022. During the event, sixteen wrestlers competed in Baptized in Blood, XPW's signature deathmatch tournament, for the XPW King of the Deathmatch Championship. The tournament was won by Shlak. Beautiful Disaster took place on June 25 and featured an eight-woman tournament to determine the first holder of the XPW Women's Championship. In the tournament final, Taya Valkyrie defeated Kamille Brickhouse, Ludark Shaitan, and Sage Sin Supreme in a ladder match to win the title.

TV series (2000–2003, 2021–present)
From April 2000 until March 2003, XPW ran a locally televised TV show, simply known as XPW TV. The show original aired on KODC-TV in Los Angeles, California, but later switched to WBGN-TV in Philadelphia, Pennsylvania, when the promotion relocated to that city. Following the relocation to Philadelphia, XPW TV would be referred to as XPW Monday Nightmare, with the television series airing on Mondays instead of its original Saturday night timeslot.

In November 2002, Kris Kloss was removed from XPW TVs announcing booth and replaced with former ECW commentator Joey Styles. Styles, however, left the company in December 2002, only spending about one month in the promotion.

In 2009, the first three seasons of XPW TV were released on DVD by Big Vision Entertainment. XPW TV matches have also been extras on several other Big Vision wrestling DVDs, including the DVD releases of Forever Hardcore and Hardcore Homecoming.

The series was revived in 2021 with weekly episodes currently airing on FITE TV.

Championships

Current champions

Retired championships
 XPW World Tag Team Championship (2002–2003, 2009)
 XPW Television Championship (2001–2003)
 XPW European Championship (2003–2005)

References

External links
 Official website
 

 
Independent professional wrestling promotions based in California
American independent professional wrestling promotions based in Pennsylvania
Entertainment companies established in 1999
1999 establishments in the United States